Thomas Joseph Bohn (born  January 17, 1980), is an American former professional baseball outfielder, who played in Major League Baseball (MLB) for the Seattle Mariners and Philadelphia Phillies. He made his MLB debut as a late-inning pinch hitter on August 22, 2006.

Career 
Bohn is a 1998 graduate of St. Louis Park High School. He graduated from Bellevue University in 2002. Bohn was drafted by the Mariners in the 30th round (910th overall) of the 2002 Major League Baseball draft.

In , Bohn played for the Minor League Baseball (MiLB) Triple-A Richmond Braves, of the International League (IL). He was designated for assignment by the parent-club Atlanta Braves on September 16, 2007, and was picked up by the Phillies, eight days later.

Bohn played most of the  season for the Phillies' Triple-A affiliate, the IL Lehigh Valley IronPigs, receiving only two short call-ups to the big league club. He became a free agent, at the end of that season.

After sitting out all of 2009, Bohn began  Spring Training with the Chicago White Sox, but ended up playing for the Sioux City Explorers of the Independent League, for two seasons.

Bohn then retired as a player, and lives in Minnesota with his wife. He now serves as the hitting coach for the Macalester College baseball team.

External links

T. J. Bohn at Pura Pelota (Venezuelan Professional Baseball League)

1980 births
Living people
Arizona League Mariners players
Baseball players from Minnesota
Bellevue Bruins baseball players
Cardenales de Lara players
American expatriate baseball players in Venezuela
Everett AquaSox players
Gulf Coast Braves players
Inland Empire 66ers of San Bernardino players
Lehigh Valley IronPigs players
Major League Baseball right fielders
Mississippi Braves players
People from St. Louis Park, Minnesota
Philadelphia Phillies players
Richmond Braves players
San Antonio Missions players
Seattle Mariners players
Sioux City Explorers players
Tacoma Rainiers players
Wisconsin Timber Rattlers players